Jiucheng is a town in  Juancheng County in western Shandong province, China, located between  southeast of the Yellow River as well as the border with Henan and  due north of the county seat. , it has 36 villages under its administration.

See also 
 List of township-level divisions of Shandong

References 

Township-level divisions of Shandong